Leire Peña Ruiz (born 20 June 2001) is a Spanish footballer who plays as a midfielder for Real Betis.

Club career
Peña started her career at Madrid CFF B.

References

External links
Profile at La Liga

2001 births
Living people
Women's association football midfielders
Spanish women's footballers
Footballers from Madrid
Madrid CFF players
Atlético Madrid Femenino players
Real Betis Féminas players
Primera División (women) players
Segunda Federación (women) players